BGL BNP Paribas (formerly Banque Générale du Luxembourg or BGL) is a Luxembourgish bank founded on 29 September 1919. Since May 2009, the bank has been a member of the BNP Paribas group. It is the fifth-largest bank in the Grand Duchy of Luxembourg and is the country's second-largest employer.

BGL BNP Paribas was ranked as the top bank in Luxembourg based on tier 1 capital by The Banker magazine in a 2014 ranking.

History

The Banque Générale du Luxembourg (BGL) was founded on 29 September 1919 by Société Générale de Belgique together with Luxembourgish and Belgian partners. Its registered office was in Arlon, Belgium, and its head office in Luxembourg City. It quickly moved into new premises at 14, rue Aldringen. By 1928, it had become a large regional bank extending its operations to the neighbouring areas of Belgium and France. In 1935, its registered office was moved to Luxembourg where BGL became a Luxembourg corporation. In the 1960s, BGL became a key player in international financial services with cross-border transactions accounting for an increasing share of its operations. In the late 1970s, it entered the Eurobond market, opening offices in Milan, Hong Kong and Frankfurt and establishing Banque Générale du Luxembourg (Suisse) in Zurich in 1982. On 29 November 1984, BGL shares were first traded on the Luxembourg Stock Exchange.

By 1999, BGL was acting as a commercial bank for its Luxembourg customers as well as an investment bank offering financial services to the international community. In February 2000, BGL and its majority shareholder Fortis formed a strategic partnership under which Fortis acquired over 97% of the bank's equity. In 2005, the bank changed its name to Fortis Bank Luxembourg. In 2008, the State of Luxembourg acquired 49.9% of the bank's shares and, in September 2008, invested EUR 2.5 billion in Fortis Bank Luxembourg. The following month, the Belgian and Luxembourg governments, in association with BNP Paribas, consolidated the Fortis business structures in Belgium and Luxembourg. In December, the State of Luxembourg became a 49.9% shareholder and changed the name of the bank to BGL. In May 2009, BNP Paribas became the majority shareholder (65.96%) in BGL, the State of Luxembourg retaining 34%. On 21 September, the bank's registered name was changed to BGL BNP Paribas and in February 2010, BGL BNP Paribas became the 100% owner of BNP Paribas Luxembourg. The transfer was finalised on 1 October 2010 with the incorporation of BNP Paribas Luxembourg's business in the operational platforms of BGL BNP Paribas.

Recent performance

The bank reported positive financial performance for the first six months of 2011 with a consolidated net profit of EUR 207.6 million and net banking income of EUR 400 million. Comparisons with the same period in 2010 were however difficult to make, given the integration of the bank into the BNP Paribas group.
During the beginning of 2019, the Private Banking sector has been separated and is it now independent.

Second-largest employer

As of 1 January 2011, BGL BNP Paribas is Luxembourg's second-largest employer with 4,110 staff, behind ArcelorMittal with 6,070.

See also
 BGL Luxembourg Open, a Luxembourg tennis tournament organised by the bank since 1991.
 List of banks in Luxembourg
BNP PRIVATE BANKING  is a sub-division of BGL BNP PARIBAS

References

Banks of Luxembourg
Banks established in 1919
Economy of Luxembourg
Companies based in Luxembourg City